NGC 3602 is a barred spiral galaxy in the constellation Leo. It was discovered on March 4, 1865 by the astronomer Albert Marth.

See also 
 List of largest galaxies
 List of nearest galaxies

References

External links 
 

Leo (constellation)
3602
Barred spiral galaxies
034351